Jacob Algera (20 March 1902 – 8 December 1966) was a Dutch politician of the defunct Anti-Revolutionary Party (ARP) now merged into the Christian Democratic Appeal (CDA).

Decorations

References

External links

Official
  Mr. J. (Jacob) Algera Parlement & Politiek

1902 births
1966 deaths
Buchenwald concentration camp survivors
Delta Works
Dutch academic administrators
Dutch jurists
Dutch prisoners of war in World War II
Grand Officers of the Order of Orange-Nassau
Mayors of Leeuwarden
Members of the Council of State (Netherlands)
Members of the Provincial Council of Friesland
Members of the Provincial-Executive of Friesland
Members of the House of Representatives (Netherlands)
Ministers of Transport and Water Management of the Netherlands
Municipal councillors of Leeuwarden
Reformed Churches Christians from the Netherlands
University of Groningen alumni
Academic staff of the University of Groningen
Academic staff of Vrije Universiteit Amsterdam
World War II civilian prisoners
World War II prisoners of war held by Germany
20th-century Dutch civil servants
20th-century Dutch educators
20th-century Dutch politicians